Nosy Faly is an island off the north west coast of Madagascar. It is part of the commune of Antafiambotry and the Ambanja District. 

It is localized near the islands of Nosy Be and Nosy Komba.

Islands of Madagascar
Geography of Madagascar